Steven Randjelovic (born 21 April 1975) is a former professional tennis player from Australia.

Career
Randjelovic appeared at his only ATP International Series event in 1998, when he competed in the main draw of both the singles and doubles at Newport's Hall of Fame Tennis Championships. He was beaten by Grant Stafford in the opening round but made the quarter-finals of the doubles, partnering Lorenzo Manta.

In 1999 he played in the Austrian Open but was unable to progress past the first round, losing to Andrei Cherkasov. He won two Challenger doubles titles that year.

He and doubles partner Ashley Fisher were given a wildcard entry into the 2000 Australian Open. They lost their opening round match to 11th seeds, Jiří Novák and David Rikl.

Challenger titles

Singles: (1)

Doubles: (3)

References

1975 births
Living people
Australian male tennis players
Place of birth missing (living people)